Chávez Ravine: A Record by Ry Cooder is the twelfth studio album by Ry Cooder. It is the first concept album and historical album by Ry Cooder which tells the story of Chávez Ravine, a Mexican-American community demolished in the 1950s in order to build public housing.  The housing was never built. Ultimately the Brooklyn Dodgers built a stadium on the site as part of their move to Los Angeles.

Chávez Ravine was nominated for "Grammy Award for Best Contemporary Folk Album" in 2006.

Track listing
 "Poor Man's Shangri-La" (Ry Cooder, William Garcia, Gene Aguilera) - 5:28
 Ry Cooder - vocal, guitar, organ, tres
 Juliette Commagere - vocal
 Jim Keltner - drums
 Mike Elizondo - bass
 Joachim Cooder - timbales
 "Onda Callejera" (David Hidalgo, William Garcia) - 3:50
 Little Willie G. - vocal
 Juliette Commagere, Carla Commagere - vocal chorus
 Ry Cooder - guitar, laud
 Joachim Cooder - percussion
 Mike Elizondo - bass
 Joe Rotondi - piano
 Gil Bernal - tenor saxophone
 Mike Bolger - trumpet
 Ledward Kaapana - guitar
 "Don't Call Me Red" (Ry Cooder) - 4:58 This song is about Frank Wilkinson
 Ry Cooder - vocal, guitar
 Juliette and Carla Commagere - vocal chorus
 Jon Hassell - trumpet
 Jim Keltner - bongos
 Joachim Cooder - timbales
 Mike Elizondo - bass
 "Corrido de Boxeo" (Lalo Guerrero) - 3:21
 Lalo Guerrero - vocal
 Ry Cooder - bajo sexto, guitar
 Joachim Cooder - drums
 Mike Elizondo - bass
 Joe Rotondi - piano
 Flaco Jiménez - accordion
 "Muy Fifí" (William Garcia, Joachim Cooder, Juliette Commagere) - 4:03
 Ersi Arvizu - vocal 
 Little Willie G., Jacob Garcia - vocal chorus
 Ry Cooder - guitar
 Joachim Cooder - drums, sampling
 Mike Elizondo - bass
 Chucho Valdés - piano
 "Los Chucos Suaves" (Lalo Guerrero) - 3:08
 Lalo Guerrero - vocal
 Ry Cooder - guitar
 Jim Keltner - drums
 Mike Elizondo - bass
 Joe Rotondi - piano
 Gil Bernal - tenor sax
 "Chinito Chinito" (Felguerez/Diaz) - 4:52
 Juliette Commagere - vocal
 Carla Commagere - vocal
 Ry Cooder - guitar
 Joachim Cooder - drums
 Jared Smith - bass
 Mike Bolger - organ, trumpet, valve trombone
 Joe Rotondi - piano
 "3 Cool Cats" (Jerry Leiber, Mike Stoller) - 2:57
 Little Willie G. - vocal
 Rudy Salas, Michael Guerra, Juliette Commagere, Carla Commagere - vocal chorus
 Ry Cooder - guitar
 Jim Keltner - drums
 Joachim Cooder - timbales
 Jared Smith - bass
 Joe Rotondi - piano
 Gil Bernal - tenor sax
 Mike Bolger - organ
 "El U.F.O. Cayó" (Juliette Commagere, Ry Cooder, Joachim Cooder, Jared Smith) - 8:22
 Juliette Commagere - vocal
 Don Tosti - vocal
 Ry Cooder - tres
 Mike Elizondo - bass
 Joachim Cooder - Sampling
 Jared Smith - keyboard
 "It's Just Work for Me" (Ry Cooder) - 5:54
 Ry Cooder - vocal, guitar
 Joachim Cooder - drums
 Mike Elizondo - bass
 "In My Town" (Ry Cooder) - 5:40
 Ry Cooder - vocal, guitar
 Sunny D. Levine - drum programming
 Jacky Terrasson - piano
 "Ejército Militar" (Rita Arvizu) - 3:16
 Ersi Arvizu - vocal
 Rosella Arvizu - vocal
 Ry Cooder - bajo sexto, guitar
 Joachim Cooder - drums
 Mike Elizondo - bass
 Flaco Jiménez - accordion
 "Barrio Viejo" (Lalo Guerrero) - 4:42
 Lalo Guerrero - vocal, guitar
 Flaco Jiménez - accordion
 Joachim Cooder - drums
 Mike Elizondo - bass
 Ledward Kaapana - guitar
 "3rd Base, Dodger Stadium" (Ry Cooder, William Garcia, Joe Kevany) - 5:45
 Bla Pahinui - vocal, guitar, ukulele
 Ry Cooder - guitar
 Joachim Cooder - drums
 Mike Elizondo - bass
 Joe Rotondi - piano
 Gil Bernal - tenor sax
 Mike Bolger - trumpet, valve trombone
 Ledward Kaapana - guitar
 "Soy Luz y Sombra" (The Cloud Forest poem; music by William Garcia, Joachim Cooder, Ry Cooder) - 3:15
 Ersi Arvizu - vocal
 Little Willie G. - vocal
 Juliette Commagere - vocal
 Ry Cooder - guitar
 Joachim Cooder - drums, sampling
 Jared Smith - bass
 David Hidalgo - guitar

Charts

References

2005 albums
Concept albums
Ry Cooder albums
Nonesuch Records albums
Albums produced by Ry Cooder
Albums recorded at Sound City Studios